McTeague is an American opera composed by William Bolcom with a libretto by Arnold Weinstein and Robert Altman. The opera is based on a novel of the same name by Frank Norris (written in 1895, published in 1899) which also served as the source material for the Erich von Stroheim film Greed (1924). The piece was written on commission for the Lyric Opera of Chicago and first performed there on October 31, 1992.

Roles

References

English-language operas
1992 operas
Operas
Operas set in the United States
Operas based on novels
Operas by William Bolcom